Frōzen Ghōst was a Canadian rock band formed in 1985 in Toronto by Arnold Lanni and Wolf Hassel, who were previously with the band Sheriff.  The band received a Juno Award for "Most Promising Group of the Year" in 1987.

The group placed five songs in the Canadian top 40 between 1987 and 1992, including "Should I See" and "Head Over Heels". "Should I See", an anti-censorship song, also became a minor hit in the United States, reaching number 69 on Billboard's Hot 100 singles in 1987. The video for that song was nominated at the 1987 Juno Awards for "Best Video of the Year".

Biography
The group was formed out of the ashes of the band, Sheriff, which had disbanded after a moderately successful run, having reached top 10 on the Canadian music charts with "When I'm With You".  Sheriff rhythm guitarist/keyboardist Arnold Lanni and bassist Wolf Hassel decided to form a new group, and Frozen Ghost was born.

On their first two albums, Frōzen Ghōst and Nice Place to Visit, the band was a studio duo, with Lanni singing lead vocals and playing all the guitar and keyboard parts, in addition to being credited as the sole songwriter, while Hassel played bass and sang backing vocals. These first two albums featured guest musicians, such as Derry Grehan, lead guitarist of Honeymoon Suite. On their final album Shake Your Spirit, there were three official additions to the band: John Bouvette, who was on drums and percussion, Sammy De Bartel on keyboards and Phil X who played the guitar and did some vocals.  Phil X was also credited on the album Nice Place to Visit for being a guitarist, but was not considered an official band member until the final album was released.

Frōzen Ghōst disbanded in 1993, following their final album Shake Your Spirit.  During the time Frozen Ghost was an active band, Sheriff's 1983 hit "When I'm With You" (written by Lanni) was re-issued, and in 1989 the track became a #1 hit in the US.  Though there were offers to reunite Sheriff, Lanni and Hassel declined.  Other members of Sheriff instead went on to form the group Alias, which experienced chart success in the 1990s.

Arnold Lanni would go on to become a successful producer for acts such as Our Lady Peace, Finger Eleven and Thousand Foot Krutch.  Hassel would resurface in 1996 with the band Erin Cody and the Drum and later appeared on a 2003 album by Toronto-based blues musician Brian Gladstone.

Hassel rejoined his former Sheriff bandmates, Freddy Curci and Steve DeMarchi on December 30, 2011 for an onstage performance by Curci and DeMarchi's post-Sheriff band, Alias, which led to his joining Alias as a permanent member in 2014.

In 2005, Warner Music Canada released the remastered compilation CD Frozen Ghost - The Essentials.

Discography

Albums

 Frōzen Ghōst - 1987
 Nice Place to Visit - 1988
 Shake Your Spirit - 1991
 The Essentials - 2005 (compilation album)

Singles

See also

Canadian rock
Metal umlaut

References

External links
 Frozen Ghost entry at JAM! Canadian Pop Encyclopedia
 Frozen Ghost TV Performance Labor DayTelethon
 Frozen Ghost Live Concert Part 1 Live
 Frozen Ghost Live Concert Part 2 Live

Musical groups established in 1985
Musical groups disestablished in 1993
Musical groups from Toronto
Canadian pop rock music groups
Atlantic Records artists
1985 establishments in Ontario
1993 disestablishments in Ontario
Juno Award for Breakthrough Group of the Year winners